The 2020 Summer Paralympics men's tournament in Tokyo began on 25 August and was ended on the 5 September 2021. The matches were played at the Musashino Forest Sport Plaza and the Ariake Arena. This was the fourteenth edition of the tournament since the tournament debut at the 1968 Summer Paralympics in Tel Aviv.

Twelve teams were separated into two groups of six with the top four qualifying through to the knockout stage of the competition. From there it would be a knockout format which would lead to the gold medal match.

Competition schedule

Qualification 
Twelve teams qualified through the qualifying stage with the host nation in Japan. The other nine spots were spread out across four different events. Four spots was taken up by European teams, three by the Americas and Asia/Pacific and one in Africa.

Squads

Preliminary round

Group A

Group B

Knockout stage

Bracket

11th–12th classification match

9th–10th classification match

Quarter-finals

7th–8th classification match

5th–6th classification match

Semi-finals

Bronze medal match

Gold medal match

Rankings

References 

Men